Gareth Warburton (born 23 April 1983) is a Welsh middle-distance runner originally from Caernarfon. He specializes in the 800 metres. Warburton finished fourth in the 800m at the 2010 Commonwealth Games. He has represented Great Britain on numerous occasions. He was also a member of the Great Britain team at the London Olympics in 2012. He was selected as part of the Welsh squad for the 2014 Commonwealth Games, however he was suspended shortly before the start of the Games after he was charged with a violation of anti-doping rules. In January 2015 UK Anti-Doping accepted that his positive test was due to taking a contaminated supplement and that he had not knowingly cheated, and gave him a six-month suspension, which was covered by the time he had been suspended since the Commonwealth Games. He is the current Welsh record holder for the 800m.

Warburton is now a Sports Massage Therapist in Whitchurch, Cardiff.

Achievements

References

External links
Sports Massage Therapist in Cardiff

1983 births
Living people
Doping cases in athletics
Welsh sportspeople in doping cases
Welsh male middle-distance runners
Commonwealth Games competitors for Wales
Athletes (track and field) at the 2006 Commonwealth Games
Athletes (track and field) at the 2010 Commonwealth Games
Athletes (track and field) at the 2012 Summer Olympics
People from Caernarfon
Sportspeople from Gwynedd
Olympic athletes of Great Britain